Chiur is a rural locality (a village) in Posyolok Zolotkovo, Gus-Khrustalny District, Vladimir Oblast, Russia. The population was 6 as of 2010.

Geography 
Chiur is located on the Sudogda River, 31 km east of Gus-Khrustalny (the district's administrative centre) by road. Narmoch is the nearest rural locality.

References 

Rural localities in Gus-Khrustalny District
Melenkovsky Uyezd